Club León debuted in the Apertura 2009.

Current roster

Transfers

In

Out

2009 Apertura

Position by fixture

Standings

Top 5 Goalscorers

References

External links
Official Website 

Club León